Terrance Kitarius McKinney  (born September 15, 1994) is an American professional mixed martial artist who currently competes in the lightweight division of the Ultimate Fighting Championship (UFC). A professional since 2017, McKinney also competed for Legacy Fighting Alliance (LFA).

Background 
McKinney was born and raised to his mother Kitara Johnson, a former gang member. McKinney and his family moved to a military base in Germany, where he was picked on due to being small, and after relocating to Davenport, Washington once his mother joined the US Army, he was picked on for being black. McKinney eventually ended up at Spokane, Washington in 2007, where he took up wrestling.

During his high school years, McKinney was a standout high school wrestler, becoming a two-time WIAA state champion out of Shadle Park High School and a Fargo All-American in freestyle. The sixth-ranked senior recruit in the country, McKinney considered skipping college wrestling to jump into MMA, a sport he had decided to pursue as a freshman, but went on to wrestle at North Idaho College, where he went 31–11 and was the top-ranked athlete during his first year in junior college ('13–'14). After a quick stint at NIC, he transferred to Chadron State College and redshirted during '14–'15.

During the summer of 2015, McKinney was extremely intoxicated after abusing LSD, psilocybin mushrooms and alcohol, and the friends he was partying with called the police and left the scene. Once police found him covered in blood (after cutting his neck with glass) and experiencing excited delirium, McKinney was transported to the hospital. In the ambulance, his heart beat stopped and died twice, though he was resuscitated twice as well. In return to the police officers who saved his life, McKinney served as a leader for the Youth Police Initiative. Referring to the incident years later, McKinney expressed:

McKinney was not kicked off the wrestling team and went on to be ranked as high as second in the nation in the NCAA Division II level during the 2015–16 season, before transferring to Notre Dame College and dropping out after one semester in order to pursue mixed martial arts.

Mixed martial arts career

Early career 
After ending his college wrestling career, McKinney made his amateur mixed martial arts debut in August 2016, winning by knockout fifteen seconds into the first round. A year later, he would turn professional, and went on to compile a 7–1 record before appearing on Dana White's Contender Series 21 in July 2019, losing by knockout to Sean Woodson. After also losing his next fight to Darrick Minner, McKinney took time off and came back in early 2021 in the lightweight division, racking up three knockouts in a row (two in the LFA) with a combined octagon time of less than two minutes in a span of four months, before signing with the Ultimate Fighting Championship.

Ultimate Fighting Championship 
Eight days after a first round knockout win in the headliner of LFA 109, McKinney made his promotional debut against Matt Frevola on June 12, 2021, at UFC 263, replacing an injured Frank Camacho. He won the fight by knockout seven seconds into the first round, setting the record for the fastest finish in UFC lightweight history. After the event, UFC president Dana White announced that even though McKinney did not receive an official Performance of the Night bonus, he would receive an unofficial one.

On February 26, 2022, McKinney faced Farès Ziam at UFC Fight Night: Makhachev vs. Green, earning a victory via rear-naked choke in the first.

In a fourteen-day turnaround, McKinney stepped in short notice to take on Drew Dober on March 12, at UFC Fight Night: Santos vs. Ankalaev, replacing an injured Ricky Glenn. McKinney knocked down Dober twice within the opening minute, but ultimately lost the fight via technical knockout in round one.

McKinney faced Erick Gonzalez on August 6, 2022, at UFC on ESPN 40. He won the fight via a rear-naked choke submission in round one.

McKinney faced Ismael Bonfim on January 21, 2023, at UFC 283. He lost the fight via a flying knee knockout in the second round.

Championships and accomplishments 

 Front Street Fights
 FSF Lightweight Championship (one time)
Sherdog
2022 Round of the Year

Mixed martial arts record 

|-
|Loss
|align=center|13–5
|Ismael Bonfim
|KO (flying knee)
|UFC 283
|
|align=center|2
|align=center|2:17
|Rio de Janeiro, Brazil
|
|-
|Win
|align=center|13–4
|Erick Gonzalez
|Submission (rear-naked choke)
|UFC on ESPN: Santos vs. Hill
|
|align=center|1
|align=center|2:17
|Las Vegas, Nevada, United States
|
|-
|Loss
|align=center|12–4
|Drew Dober
|TKO (knee and punches)
|UFC Fight Night: Santos vs. Ankalaev
|
|align=center|1
|align=center|3:17
|Las Vegas, Nevada, United States
|
|-
|Win
|align=center|12–3
|Farès Ziam
|Submission (rear-naked choke)
|UFC Fight Night: Makhachev vs. Green
|
|align=center|1
|align=center|2:11
|Las Vegas, Nevada, United States
|
|-
|Win
|align=center|11–3
|Matt Frevola
|KO (punches)
|UFC 263
|
|align=center|1
|align=center|0:07
|Glendale, Arizona, United States
|
|-
|Win
|align=center|10–3
|Michael Irizarry Ortiz
|KO (punches)
|LFA 109
|
|align=center|1
|align=center|1:12
|Shawnee, Oklahoma, United States
|
|-
|Win
|align=center|9–3
|Toninho Gavinho
|KO (head kick)
|LFA 106
|
|align=center|1
|align=center|0:17
|Shawnee, Oklahoma, United States
|
|-
|Win
|align=center|8–3
|Dedrek Sanders
|TKO (punches)
|SHP 59
|
|align=center|1
|align=center|0:16
|Chattanooga, Tennessee, United States
|
|-
|Loss
|align=center|7–3
|Darrick Minner
|Submission (triangle choke)
|MCF 18
|
|align=center|1
|align=center|0:57
|North Platte, Nebraska, United States
|
|-
|Loss
|align=center|7–2
|Sean Woodson
|KO (flying knee)
|Dana White's Contender Series 21
|
|align=center|2
|align=center|1:49
|Las Vegas, Nevada, United States
|
|-
|Win
|align=center|7–1
|Charon Spain
|Submission (rear–naked choke)
|ExciteFight: Conquest of the Cage
|
|align=center|1
|align=center|0:43
|Airway Heights, Washington, United States
|
|-
|Win
|align=center|6–1
|Bobby McIntyre
|Submission (rear–naked choke)
|Front Street Fights 19
|
|align=center|1
|align=center|2:57
|Boise, Idaho, United States
|
|-
|Win
|align=center|5–1
|Jeff Coleman
|TKO (punches)
|ExciteFight: Conquest of the Cage
|
|align=center|1
|align=center|0:07
|Airway Heights, Washington, United States
|
|-
|Loss
|align=center|4–1
|Tyrone Henderson
|TKO (leg injury)
|CageSport 52
|
|align=center|1
|align=center|0:39
|Tacoma, Washington, United States
|
|-
|Win
|align=center|4–0
|Brandon Todd
|Submission (kneebar)
|CageSport 50
|
|align=center|3
|align=center|0:43
|Tacoma, Washington, United States
|
|-
|Win
|align=center|3–0
|Tyrone Henderson
|Submission (armbar)
|CageSport 49
|
|align=center|1
|align=center|1:39
|Tacoma, Washington, United States
|
|-
|Win
|align=center|2–0
|Armando Best
|Submission (rear–naked choke)
|CageSport 48
|
|align=center|1
|align=center|1:23
|Tacoma, Washington, United States
|
|-
|Win
|align=center|1–0
|Armando Best
|Submission (rear–naked choke)
|CageSport 47
|
|align=center|1
|align=center|2:15
|Tacoma, Washington, United States
|
|-

See also 
 List of current UFC fighters
 List of male mixed martial artists

References

External links 
  
 

1994 births
Living people
American male mixed martial artists
Lightweight mixed martial artists
Mixed martial artists utilizing collegiate wrestling
Mixed martial artists utilizing freestyle wrestling
Mixed martial artists utilizing Brazilian jiu-jitsu
American male sport wrestlers
Amateur wrestlers
American practitioners of Brazilian jiu-jitsu
Ultimate Fighting Championship male fighters
Sportspeople from Washington (state)